Tage is a masculine given name with Danish origins. People with the name include:

 Tage Åsén (born 1943), Swedish artist
 Tage Aurell (1895–1976), Swedish journalist and novelist
 Tage Brauer (1894–1988), Swedish athlete
 Tage Danielsson (1928–1985), Swedish writer and comedian
 Tage Frid (1915–2004), Danish-born woodworker and teacher
 Tage Ekfeldt (1926–2005), Swedish sprinter
 Tage Erlander (1901–1985), 25th Prime Minister of Sweden
 Tage Flisberg (1917–1989), Swedish table tennis player
 Tage Fahlborg (1912–2005), Swedish canoeist
 Tage Grøndahl (1931–2014), Danish rower
 Tage Grönwall (1903–1988), Swedish diplomat
 Tage Henriksen (1925–2016), Danish rower
 Tage Holmberg (1913–1989), Swedish film editor
 Tage Johnson (1878–1950), Swedish rower
 Tage Jönsson (1920–2001), Swedish racewalker
 Tage Jørgensen (1918–1999), Danish fencer
 Tage Lindbom (1909–2001), Swedish political writer
 Tage Lundin (1933–2019), Swedish biathlete
 Tage Madsen (1919–2004), Danish badminton player
 Tage Møller (1914–2006), Danish cyclist
 Tage Nielsen (1929–2003), Danish composer
 Tage Olihn (1908–1996), Swedish Army lieutenant general
 Tage Pettersen (born 1972), Norwegian politician
 Tage Reedtz-Thott (1839–1923), Danish politician 
 Tage Schultz (1916–1983), Danish field hockey player
 Tage Skou-Hansen (1925–2015), Danish writer
 Tage Thompson (born 1997), American hockey player
 Tage Juhl Weirum (born 1949), Danish wrestler
 Tage William-Olsson (1888–1960), Swedish architect
 Tage Wissnell (1905–1984), Swedish swimmer and footballer
Dan Tage Larsson (1948–), Swedish musician who gave rock band Tages their name

Scandinavian masculine given names
Danish masculine given names
Norwegian masculine given names
Swedish masculine given names